Khoe may be:
Khoe languages
the Khoe language
the Khoekhoe people
the Khoekhoe language

See also
 Kho (disambiguation)